Stockton Township is one of twenty-three townships in Jo Daviess County, Illinois, USA.  As of the 2010 census, its population was 2,453 and it contained 1,141 housing units.

Geography

Cities, towns, villages
 Village of Stockton.

Lost Settlements
 Morseville.
 Pitcherville.
 Yankee Hollow.

Cemeteries
The township contains:
 Holy Cross Catholic Cemetery.
 Ladies Union Cemetery.

Major highways
  U.S. Route 20 - running east-west.
  Illinois Route 78 - running north-south.

Airports and landing strips
 John L Coppernoll Airport (4LL3).
 Stockton Airport (IS37).

Demographics

School districts
 Stockton Community Unit School District 206.

Political districts
 Illinois's 16th congressional district.
 State House District 89.
 State Senate District 45.

References
 
 United States Census Bureau 2007 TIGER/Line Shapefiles.
 United States National Atlas.

External links
 Jo Daviess County official site.
 City-Data.com.
 Illinois State Archives.
 Township Officials of Illinois.

Townships in Jo Daviess County, Illinois
Townships in Illinois